Within Bangkok, the capital of Thailand, there are over 165 completed skyscrapers, i.e. tall habitable buildings that stand at least 150 metres (495 feet) based on standard height measurement.  In addition, there are over 40 skyscrapers under construction as of October 2022.  According to the Council on Tall Buildings and Urban Habitat database Bangkok is ranked 14th in the world in terms of the total number of skyscrapers.  Based on an alternative listing compiled by Emporis, Bangkok had, as of September 2022, 463 completed buildings that stand at least 100 metres (330 feet) tall.  The city was ranked 6th overall after Hong Kong, New York City, Shenzhen, Tokyo and Singapore.

Bangkok experienced a building boom in the late 1980s and early 1990s when Thailand experienced rapid economic growth. However, the 1997 Asian Financial Crisis left a visible scar on the city’s skyline with many unfinished or abandoned buildings. The Thai economy rebounded in the early 2000s and many projects resumed construction. A new wave of building boom over the last decade was spurred by the development of the city’s mass rapid transit systems, with new development concentrated around MRT and BTS skytrain stations.

Magnolias Waterfront Residences at Iconsiam, completed in 2018, is Bangkok’s tallest building at 318 metres (1,043 feet), followed by King Power Mahanakhon Tower at 314 metres (1,034 feet). Several skyscraper projects are currently under construction or in the planning phase, including the 92-storey 437 metres/1,435 feet tall Signature Tower at One Bangkok complex, Dusit Thani Residences and Asiatique the Riverfront’s Iconic Tower. The latter is designed by Adrian Smith and Gordon Gill, architects of the Burj Khalifa in Dubai.

Panoramic view of Bangkok’s skyline looking north/north-east from King Power Mahanakhon Tower

Tallest completed buildings
This list ranks completed and topped out skyscrapers in Bangkok that stand at least 150m/492 ft based on standard height measurement as of October 2022.  This includes spires and architectural details, but does not include antenna masts. An equal sign (=) following a rank indicates the same height between two or more buildings. The list contain buildings within the 50 districts of the Bangkok Metropolis, excluding the surrounding provinces of Nonthaburi, Pathumthani, Samutprakarn, Nakhon Pathom and Samut Sakhon, which form part of the Greater Bangkok Metropolitan Region.

Tallest buildings by function 
This lists the tallest buildings in Bangkok by their respective functions—office, hotel, residential and mixed-use—based on standard height measurement.

Tallest under construction 
List of buildings taller than 150 metres (495 feet) that are under construction within the Bangkok Metropolitan Administration area as of August 2022.

Tallest proposed 
List of significant skyscrapers that will rise more than 200 metres, including those that received environmental approvals, cancelled or never built.

Tallest buildings by district 
The tallest skyscrapers in selected districts of the Bangkok Metropolitan Administration Area.

Timeline of tallest buildings 
This is a list of buildings that in the past held, or currently holds the title of tallest building in Bangkok.

Gallery

See also 
List of tallest buildings in the world
List of tallest buildings in Asia
List of cities with the most skyscrapers
List of tallest buildings in Thailand

References

External links
 Diagram of Bangkok skyscrapers on SkyscraperPage

Skyscrapers in Bangkok
Buildings and structures in Bangkok
Bangkok